Natatolana paranarica is a species of crustacean in the family Cirolanidae, and was first described by Stephen John Keable in 2006. The species epithet, paranarica, was given because of the species' likeness to Natatolana narica.

It is a benthic species, living at depths of about 6 m in temperate waters, and is known only from the type locality.

References

External links
Natatolana paranarica occurrence data from GBIF

Cymothoida
Crustaceans of New Zealand
Crustaceans described in 2006
Taxa named by Stephen John Keable